Francesco Ripa (born 7 April 1974) is an Italian footballer.

Biography
Born in Porto San Giorgio, Marche, Ripa started his career at Sangiorgese of Eccellenza Marche. He then moved to Carpi, Fermana and then Cosenza (in co-ownership deal with Genoa until 2001, exchanged with Salvatore Soviero in 1998.) With Cosenza, he played 5 Serie B seasons (1 season loaned to Serie C1 club Pisa.)

In mid-2003 he joined Ravenna and in January 2004 moved to Sora. Since 2005, he spent 5 seasons at Foligno, which he played 17, 31, 32, 20 and 0 games respectively. In the last season he was the backup of Andrea Rossini and Luca Tomassini. In 2010–11 season, he played for Serie D club Perugia, shared the starting role with Lorenzo Riommi, winning Group E champion and promoted back to professional football.

In October 2011 he joined another Serie D club Santegidiese.

References

External links
 Football.it Profile 
 
 LaSerieD.com Profile 
 FIGC  

Italian footballers
Italy under-21 international footballers
A.C. Carpi players
A.C. Perugia Calcio players
Cosenza Calcio 1914 players
Pisa S.C. players
Ravenna F.C. players
A.S.D. Città di Foligno 1928 players
Association football goalkeepers
Sportspeople from the Province of Fermo
1974 births
Living people
Footballers from Marche